A Romance of Burke and Wills Expedition of 1860 is a 1918 Australian silent film. The plot is fictional and is loosely based around the Burke and Wills expedition.

Plot
Robert O'Hara Burke leads an expedition from Melbourne to the north of Australia, including William John Wills, John King, Gray, Dandells and Brahe. Although he reaches the Gulf of Carpentaria along with Wills and King when they return to their base at Cooper Creek they discover their comrades have left without them. Burke and Wills both die but King is rescued by aborigines and survives. A fictitious romance was added to the story.

Chapter headings included:
a love romance
a minuet of 1857
expedition leaves Melbourne
scenes along the route
customs and habits of natives
gorgeous desert sunsets
historic landmarks
there is no death.

Cast
Charles Clarke as Robert O'Hara Burke
George Patterson as William John Wills
Chris Olsen as John King
G. Gould as W. Grey
Bias Kotes as William Brahe
David Edelsten as Mayor of Melbourne
Vera Chamberlain as Mina Doyle
Ona Landers as Stella McDonald
Madame Carbasse as Mrs Doyle
Melville Stevenson as Dost Mahommed
Astor Lewis as Bridget
Yvonne Blight as maid
Dorothy Beer and Evelyn Hooper as Mina's sisters
Clayre St Start and Ida Hooper

Production
The film was completed in November 1917 and originally ran for three reels. Director Charles Coates then spent another month in central Australia shooting additional footage. Filming took over 12 months all up and involved more than 300 people. Reportedly shooting some scenes involved a risk to the cinematographer's life.

The cast included Madam Carbasse, the French mother of Louise Lovely.

Release
The movie was previewed to the trade in May 1918 and submitted for censorship in June 1918.

References

External links

The Romance of Burke and Wills Expedition at National Film and Sound Archive

1918 films
Australian drama films
Australian black-and-white films
Australian silent feature films
1918 drama films
Silent drama films
1910s English-language films